Look Out! is an album by jazz organist Johnny "Hammond" Smith, with saxophonist Seldon Powell, recorded for the New Jazz label in 1962.

Reception

Allmusic awarded the album 3 stars.

Track listing
All compositions by Johnny "Hammond" Smith except where noted
 "Upset" – 3:32
 "Soul Grits" – 5:51
 "There'll Never Be a Love" – 7:25  
 "Let Everybody Say Amen" – 5:03
 "Clemente" – 5:37
 "I'm Glad There Is You" (Jimmy Dorsey, Paul Mertz) – 4:18    
 "Que Sera Baby" – 3:41

Personnel
Johnny "Hammond" Smith – organ
Seldon Powell – tenor saxophone
Clement Wells – vibraphone
Wally Richardson – guitar
Leo Stevens – drums

Production
 Esmond Edwards – producer
 Rudy Van Gelder – engineer

References

Johnny "Hammond" Smith albums
1962 albums
New Jazz Records albums
Albums produced by Esmond Edwards
Albums recorded at Van Gelder Studio